Sir Jude Ejiogu is a Nigerian politician from Imo state, Nigeria. He was a former Secretary to Imo State Government and former  chief of staff to the governor of Imo State.

Background
Ejiogu is an Igbo, born into a catholic family in Emekuku, Owerri Imo State. He is also a one time chairman of the Local Government Civil Service Commission in Imo.

References

Living people
Imo State
Igbo politicians
Imo State politicians
Year of birth missing (living people)